Gregory L. Nesbit (born July 18, 1971) is an American hip hop record producer and songwriter, better known by his stage name G-Whizz. Whizz has produced for artists such as Fred the Godson, French Montana, Yo Gotti, Ace Hood, Busta Rhymes, Nino Brown, and Father MC. Whizz is owner and operator of G-Whizz Productions LLC based in Historic Georgetown SC. He is best known for producing Nino Brown's "Tryna Come Up (Remix)" with fellow producer Jon-Oh, and Fred The Godson's "Armegeddon", which was the title track of his mixtape as he debut on XXL (magazine) Freshman Class of 2011.

Music career 
Whizz initially gained prominence in the music spotlight when he entered The King of the Ring freestyle and producer battle while attending the 2007 Southeastern Music and Entertainment Summit in Myrtle Beach, South Carolina. He was crowned king of the ring for three consecutive years.

References

External links 
 baddASS : Bass drum fortification VST endorsement
  G-Whizz – Exclusive iStandard iNterview

1971 births
Living people
American hip hop record producers